Asiagate is the name of the match fixing scandal that involved players and officials of the Zimbabwe national football team. Zimbabwe's national team (sometimes composed of local players) underwent tours of Asia and lost several games which led to suspicions of match fixing.

The conspiracy was reportedly established by Singaporean Wilson Raj Perumal who was arrested in Finland for attempting to fix Finnish matches.

In February 2012, ZIFA Chief Executive Jonathan Mashingaidze was kidnapped having been investigating into the match-fixing.

As of March 2012, 98 Zimbabwean players had been suspended due to an ongoing investigation.

The Zimbabwean Warriors' national team coach Norman Mapeza and his assistant Joey Antipas have also been suspended.

 was suspended for 10 years.

Matches

Malaysia cancelled a friendly with Liberia and invited Zimbabwe as a replacement. Zimbabwe's Football Association sent Monomotapa United F.C to represent the FA. The match was stripped of its "A" status when it was found that it was a club side in national team colours.

References 

Match fixing
2012 scandals
Bribery scandals
Association football controversies
2011 in African football
2012 in African football
2012 controversies